Bidone d'oro, Italian for "Golden Bin" or "Golden Trashcan", was a tongue-in-cheek prize given to the most disappointing player in Serie A at the end of each calendar year. A play on Ballon d'Or, the winner was chosen through votes by listeners of the Catersport show on Rai Radio 2. The prize was first awarded in 2003 to Rivaldo of Milan, and was discontinued in 2012 when Catersport went off the air. The final Bidone d'Oro was awarded at the end of 2012 to Alexandre Pato following a vote on the discontinued show's Facebook page.

Winners

Wins by club

References

Ironic and humorous awards
Awards established in 2003
Association football culture
Italian football trophies and awards
Awards disestablished in 2012